Ahmed Al-Ahmed (born 11 July 1962) is a Kuwaiti foil and sabre fencer. He competed at the 1980 and 1984 Summer Olympics.

References

External links
 

1962 births
Living people
Kuwaiti male foil fencers
Olympic fencers of Kuwait
Fencers at the 1980 Summer Olympics
Fencers at the 1984 Summer Olympics
Kuwaiti male sabre fencers